In musical tuning theory, a Pythagorean interval is a musical interval with frequency ratio equal to a power of two divided by a power of three, or vice versa. For instance, the perfect fifth with ratio 3/2 (equivalent to 31/ 21) and the perfect fourth with ratio 4/3 (equivalent to 22/ 31) are Pythagorean intervals.

All the intervals between the notes of a scale are Pythagorean if they are tuned using the Pythagorean tuning system. However, some Pythagorean intervals are also used in other tuning systems. For instance, the above-mentioned Pythagorean perfect fifth and fourth are also used in just intonation.

Interval table

Notice that the terms ditone and semiditone are specific for Pythagorean tuning, while tone and tritone are used generically for all tuning systems. Despite its name, a semiditone (3 semitones, or about 300 cents) can hardly be viewed as half of a ditone (4 semitones, or about 400 cents).

12-tone Pythagorean scale 
The table shows from which notes some of the above listed intervals can be played on an instrument using a repeated-octave 12-tone scale (such as a piano) tuned with D-based symmetric Pythagorean tuning. Further details about this table can be found in Size of Pythagorean intervals.

Fundamental intervals
The fundamental intervals are the superparticular ratios 2/1, 3/2, and 4/3. 2/1 is the octave or diapason (Greek for "across all"). 3/2 is the perfect fifth, diapente ("across five"), or sesquialterum. 4/3 is the perfect fourth, diatessaron ("across four"), or sesquitertium. These three intervals and their octave equivalents, such as the perfect eleventh and twelfth, are the only absolute consonances of the Pythagorean system. All other intervals have varying degrees of dissonance, ranging from smooth to rough.

The difference between the perfect fourth and the perfect fifth is the tone or major second. This has the ratio 9/8, also known as epogdoon and it is the only other superparticular ratio of Pythagorean tuning, as shown by Størmer's theorem.

Two tones make a ditone, a dissonantly wide major third, ratio 81/64. The ditone differs from the just major third (5/4) by the syntonic comma (81/80). Likewise, the difference between the tone and the perfect fourth is the semiditone, a narrow minor third, 32/27, which differs from 6/5 by the syntonic comma. These differences are "tempered out" or eliminated by using compromises in meantone temperament.

The difference between the minor third and the tone is the minor semitone or limma of 256/243. The difference between the tone and the limma is the major semitone or apotome ("part cut off") of 2187/2048. Although the limma and the apotome are both represented by one step of 12-pitch equal temperament, they are not equal in Pythagorean tuning, and their difference, 531441/524288, is known as the Pythagorean comma.

Contrast with modern nomenclature
There is a one-to-one correspondence between interval names (number of scale steps + quality) and frequency ratios. This contrasts with equal temperament, in which intervals with the same frequency ratio can have different names (e.g., the diminished fifth and the augmented fourth); and with other forms of just intonation, in which intervals with the same name can have different frequency ratios (e.g., 9/8 for the major second from C to D, but 10/9 for the major second from D to E).

See also
Generated collection
Just intonation
List of meantone intervals
List of intervals in 5-limit just intonation
Shí-èr-lǜ
Whole-tone scale

References

External links
Neo-Gothic usage by Margo Schulter

3-limit tuning and intervals

cs:Ditón
de:Ditonus
es:Ditono
eo:Ditono
nl:Ditonus
ru:Дитон